829 Academia is a minor planet orbiting the Sun. The asteroid is roughly 44 km in diameter and has a low albedo. Photometric measurements of the asteroid made in 2005 at the Palmer Divide Observatory showed a light curve with a period of 7.891 ± 0.005 hours and a brightness variation of 0.44 ± 0.02 in magnitude.

References

External links 
 Lightcurve plot of 829 Academia, Palmer Divide Observatory, B. D. Warner (2005)
 Asteroid Lightcurve Database (LCDB), query form (info )
 Dictionary of Minor Planet Names, Google books
 Asteroids and comets rotation curves, CdR – Observatoire de Genève, Raoul Behrend
 Discovery Circumstances: Numbered Minor Planets (1)-(5000) – Minor Planet Center
 
 

000829
Discoveries by Grigory Neujmin
Named minor planets
19160825